Mucilaginibacter craterilacus is a Gram-negative and non-motile bacterium from the genus of Mucilaginibacter which has been isolated from the soil of a crater lake from Baekrokdam on the Jeju Island.

References

External links
Type strain of Mucilaginibacter craterilacus at BacDive -  the Bacterial Diversity Metadatabase

Sphingobacteriia
Bacteria described in 2017